The North Halmahera languages are a family of languages spoken in the northern and eastern parts of the island of Halmahera and some neighboring islands in Indonesia. The southwestern part of the island is occupied by the unrelated South Halmahera languages, which are a subgroup of Austronesian. They may be most closely related to the languages of the Bird's Head region of West Papua, but this is not well-established.

Spoken in the Maluku Islands, they are some of the westernmost Papuan languages (the only other such outlier family in eastern Indonesia being Timor–Alor–Pantar). Located within Southeast Asia, the two families are arguably the only non-Melanesian linguistic groups that can be linked to the Papuan families of Oceania. The languages were possibly brought to the region as a result of migration from New Guinea, likely predating the arrival of Austronesian languages. The best known North Halmaheran language is Ternate (50,000 native speakers), which is a regional lingua franca and which, along with Tidore, were the languages of the rival medieval Ternate and Tidore sultanates, famous for their role in the spice trade. The ethnic groups of the north Halmahera area share civilizational links with the Islamic world and the populations of western Indonesia, betraying a mismatch between cultural and linguistic affiliation.

Genetic and areal relations
The North Halmahera languages are classified by some to be part of a larger West Papuan family, along with the languages of the Bird's Head region of Western New Guinea, while others consider North Halmahera to form a distinct language family, with no demonstrable relationship outside the region. The languages of North Halmahera appear to have the closest affinity with the languages of the Bird's Head, which suggests a migration from the western Bird's Head to northern Halmahera. However, Ger Reesink notes that the evidence for genetic relatedness between the different "West Papuan" groupings is too skimpy to form a firm conclusion, suggesting that they be considered an areal network of unrelated linguistic families.  
Robert Blust (2013) considers this paradox to be a result of historical language replacement.

Holton and Klamer (2018: 626) do not unequivocally accept the genealogical unity of West Papuan, but note that the more restricted "West Papuan" proposal, linking North Halmahera with West Bird's Head in particular (and also the Yapen (Yawa) languages), appears to be particularly convincing.

Ternate, Tidore, West Makian, and Sahu have received extensive Austronesian influence in terms of grammar. Bert Voorhoeve noted a set of lexical similarities between the North Halmahera languages and the Central Papuan languages of the south coast of Papua New Guinea, possibly arising from potential language contact.

Internal classification
The family is dialectally heterogeneous, with blurry lines between different languages. While different authors tend to disagree on the number of distinct languages identified, there is general accord regarding the internal subgrouping of the family.

The classification used here is that of Voorhoeve 1988.

West Makian is divergent due to heavy Austronesian influence. It was once classified as an Austronesian language. It should be distinguished from East Makian (Taba), an unrelated Austronesian language.

There is a degree of mutual intelligibility between the Galela–Tobelo languages, and Voorhoeve 1988 considered them dialects of a language he called Northeast Halmaheran, though most speakers consider them to be distinct languages.

Ternate and Tidore are generally treated as separate languages, though there is little Abstand involved, and the separation appears to be based on sociopolitical grounds. Voorhoeve groups these idioms together as varieties of a unitary "Ternate-Tidore" language, while Miriam van Staden classifies them as distinct languages. Other North Halmahera languages, such as Galela and Tobelo, have received significant influence from Ternate, a historical legacy of the dominance of the Ternate Sultanate in the Moluccas. Many Ternate loanwords can be found in Sahu.

Vocabulary comparison
The following basic vocabulary words are from the Trans-New Guinea database:

{| class="wikitable sortable"
! gloss !! Sahu !! Tidore !! West Makian
|-
! head
| sae'e || dofolo || apota; tabia
|-
! hair
| utu || hutu || gigo; onga
|-
! ear
| kocowo'o; ngau'u; 'oki; sidete || ngau || kameu
|-
! eye
| la'o || lao || afe; sado
|-
! nose
| cu'dumu; ngunungu; payáha || ngun || mudefete
|-
! tooth
| ngi'di || ing || wi
|-
! tongue
| yai'i || aki || belo
|-
! leg
|  ||  || tarotaro
|-
! louse
| gane || gan || bene
|-
! dog
| nunu'u || kaso || aso
|-
! bird
| namo || namo || haywan
|-
! egg
| gosi; tounu || gosi || esi
|-
! blood
| ngaunu || au || uni
|-
! bone
| 'bero; 'obongo || goka || subebi
|-
! skin
| eno'o || ahi || fi
|-
! breast
| susu || isu || susu
|-
! man
| nau'u || nau-nau || at
|-
! woman
| weré'a || faya || papa; songa
|-
! sky
| diwanga || sorga || tupam
|-
! moon
| ngara || ora || odo
|-
! water
| 'banyo || ake || be
|-
! fire
| ci'du; naoto; u'u || uku || ipi
|-
! stone
| ma'di || mafu || may
|-
! road, path
| ngo'omo; tapaka || linga || gopao
|-
! name
| lomanga || ronga || aym
|-
! eat
| 'doroga; kou; oromo; tabu || oyo; talesa || am; fajow; fiam
|-
! one
| maténgo; moi || rimoi || gominye; maminye; meminye; minye
|-
! two
| 'di'di; romo'dí'di || malofo || dimaede; edeng; je; maedeng; medeng
|}

Proto-language

Proto-North Halmahera consonants are (after Voorhoeve 1994: 68, cited in Holton and Klamer 2018: 584):

{| 
| p || t ||  || k || q
|-
| b || d || ɖ || g || 
|-
| m || n ||  || ŋ || 
|-
| f || s ||  ||  || h
|-
| w ||  ||  ||  || 
|-
|  || l (r) ||  ||  || 
|}

Proto-North Halmahera is notable for having the voiced retroflex stop *ɖ, as retroflex consonants are often not found in Papuan languages.

The following proto-North Halmahera reconstructions are listed in Holton and Klamer (2018: 620–621). Most of the forms in Holton and Klamer are derived from Wada (1980).

proto-North Halmahera reconstructions (Holton & Klamer 2018)

{| class="wikitable sortable"
! gloss !! proto-North Halmahera
|-
| ‘back’ || *ḋuḋun
|-
| ‘bad’ || *torou
|-
| ‘bark’ || *kahi
|-
| ‘big’ || *lamok
|-
| ‘bite’ || *goli
|-
| ‘black’ || *tarom
|-
| ‘blood’ || *aun
|-
| ‘blow’ || *hoa
|-
| ‘blue’ || *bisi
|-
| ‘boil’ || *sakahi
|-
| ‘bone’ || *koboŋ
|-
| ‘brother’ || *hiraŋ
|-
| ‘burn’ || *so(ŋa)ra
|-
| ‘child’ || *ŋopak
|-
| ‘cloud’ || *lobi
|-
| ‘cold’ (1) || *alo
|-
| ‘cold’ (2) || *malat
|-
| ‘come’ || *bola
|-
| ‘count’ || *etoŋ
|-
| ‘cry’ || *ores
|-
| ‘cut’ || *luit
|-
| ‘dance’ || *selo
|-
| ‘die’ || *soneŋ
|-
| ‘dig’ || *puait
|-
| ‘dirty’ || *pepeke
|-
| ‘dog’ || *kaso
|-
| ‘dull’ || *boŋo
|-
| ‘ear’ || *ŋauk
|-
| ‘earth’ || *tonak
|-
| ‘eat’ || *oḋom
|-
| ‘egg’ || *boro
|-
| ‘eight’ || *tupaaŋe
|-
| ‘eye’ || *lako
|-
| ‘fall’ || *ḋota
|-
| ‘far’ || *kurut
|-
| ‘fat, grease’ || *saki
|-
| ‘father’ || *baba
|-
| ‘fear’ || *moḋoŋ
|-
| ‘feather’ || *gogo
|-
| ‘female’ || *ŋopeḋeka
|-
| ‘few’ || *ucu
|-
| ‘fight’ || *kuḋubu
|-
| ‘fire’ || *uku
|-
| ‘fish’ || *nawok
|-
| ‘five’ || *motoha
|-
| ‘float’ || *bawo
|-
| ‘flow’ || *uhis
|-
| ‘flower’ || *leru
|-
| ‘fly’ || *sosor
|-
| ‘fog’ || *rasa
|-
| ‘four’ || *ihat
|-
| ‘fruit’ || *sopok
|-
| ‘give’ || *hike
|-
| ‘good’ || *loha
|-
| ‘grass’ || *ŋaŋaru
|-
| ‘green’ || *ijo
|-
| ‘guts’ || *toto
|-
| ‘hair’ || *hutu
|-
| ‘hand’ || *giam
|-
| ‘head’ || *sahek
|-
| ‘hear’ || *isen
|-
| ‘heart’ || *siniŋa
|-
| ‘heavy’ || *tubuso
|-
| ‘hit’ || *ŋapo
|-
| ‘horn’ || *taḋu
|-
| ‘hot’ || *sahuk
|-
| ‘husband’ || *rokat
|-
| ‘kill’ || *tooma
|-
| ‘knee’ || *puku
|-
| ‘know’ || *nako
|-
| ‘lake’ || *talaga
|-
| ‘laugh’ || *ḋohe
|-
| ‘leaf’ || *soka
|-
| ‘left’ || *gubali
|-
| ‘leg/foot’ || *ḋohu
|-
| ‘lie’ || *ḋaḋu
|-
| ‘live’ || *oho
|-
| ‘liver’ || *gate
|-
| ‘long’ (1) || *kurut
|-
| ‘long’ (2) || *teka
|-
| ‘louse/flea’ || *gani
|-
| ‘male’ || *naur
|-
| ‘many’ || *ḋala
|-
| ‘meat’ || *lake
|-
| ‘moon’ || *ŋoosa
|-
| ‘mother’ || *awa
|-
| ‘mountain’ || *tala
|-
| ‘mouth’ || *uru
|-
| ‘nail’ || *gitipir
|-
| ‘name’ || *roŋa
|-
| ‘narrow’ || *peneto
|-
| ‘near’ || *ḋumu
|-
| ‘neck’ || *toko
|-
| ‘new’ || *momuane
|-
| ‘night’ || *putu
|-
| ‘nine’ || *siwo
|-
| ‘nose’ || *ŋunuŋ
|-
| ‘old’ || *ŋowo
|-
| ‘one’ || *moi
|-
| ‘person’ || *ɲawa
|-
| ‘pierce’ || *topok
|-
| ‘pull’ || *lia
|-
| ‘push’ || *hito(si)
|-
| ‘rain’ || *muura
|-
| ‘red’ || *sawala
|-
| ‘right’ || *girinak
|-
| ‘river’ || *selera
|-
| ‘roast’ || *tupu
|-
| ‘root’ || *ŋutuk
|-
| ‘rope’ || *gumin
|-
| ‘rotten’ || *baka
|-
| ‘round’ || *pululun
|-
| ‘rub’ || *ese
|-
| ‘salt’ || *gasi
|-
| ‘sand’ || *ḋowoŋi
|-
| ‘say’ || *temo
|-
| ‘scratch’ || *rago
|-
| ‘sea’ || *ŋolot
|-
| ‘see’ || *kelelo
|-
| ‘seed’ || *gisisi
|-
| ‘seven’ || *tumuḋiŋi
|-
| ‘sew’ || *urit
|-
| ‘sharp’ || *ḋoto
|-
| ‘shoot’ || *ḋupu
|-
| ‘short’ || *timisi
|-
| ‘sing’ || *ɲaɲi
|-
| ‘sister’ || *biraŋ
|-
| ‘sit’ || *tamie
|-
| ‘six’ || *butaŋa
|-
| ‘skin’ || *kahi
|-
| ‘sky’ || *ḋipaŋ
|-
| ‘sleep’ || *kiolok
|-
| ‘small’ || *ece
|-
| ‘smell’ || *hame
|-
| ‘smoke’ || *ḋopo
|-
| ‘smooth’ || *maahi
|-
| ‘snake’ || *ŋihia
|-
| ‘speak’ || *bicara
|-
| ‘spear’ || *kamanu
|-
| ‘spit’ || *hobir
|-
| ‘split’ || *raca
|-
| ‘stand’ || *oko
|-
| ‘star’ || *ŋoma
|-
| ‘stone’ || *teto
|-
| ‘straight’ || *bolowo
|-
| ‘suck’ || *suyu
|-
| ‘swell’ || *ḋobo
|-
| ‘swim’ || *toboŋ
|-
| ‘tail’ || *pego
|-
| ‘take, hold’ || *aho
|-
| ‘ten’ || *mogiowok
|-
| ‘thick’ || *kipirin
|-
| ‘thin’ || *hina
|-
| ‘think’ || *fikiri < Arabic
|-
| ‘three’ || *saaŋe
|-
| ‘throw’ || *sariwi
|-
| ‘tie’ || *piriku
|-
| ‘to dry’ || *ḋuḋuŋ
|-
| ‘tongue’ || *akir
|-
| ‘tooth’ || *iŋir
|-
| ‘tree’ || *gota
|-
| ‘true’ || *tero
|-
| ‘twenty’ || *monohalok
|-
| ‘two’ || *sinoto
|-
| ‘vomit’ || *ŋunaŋ
|-
| ‘walk’ || *tagi
|-
| ‘warm’ || *sakuk
|-
| ‘wash’ || *boka
|-
| ‘water’ || *aker
|-
| ‘way’ || *ŋekom
|-
| ‘wet’ || *pesa
|-
| ‘white’ || *ares
|-
| ‘wide’ || *ŋohat
|-
| ‘wife’ || *peḋakat
|-
| ‘wind’ || *paro
|-
| ‘wing’ || *golipupu
|-
| ‘wipe’ || *piki
|-
| ‘woods’ || *poŋan
|-
| ‘worm’ || *kalubati
|-
| ‘young’ || *kiau
|}

References

External links

North Halmahera word lists (Austronesian Basic Vocabulary Database)

 
West Papuan languages
Languages of the Maluku Islands
Language families
Halmahera